Pachycerosia bipunctulata is a moth of the subfamily Arctiinae. It was described by van Eecke in 1927. It is found on Sumatra.

References

Lithosiini
Moths described in 1927